List of Korean television series may refer to:

List of North Korean television series
List of South Korean television series

See also
List of North Korean actors
List of South Korean actors
List of North Korean films, for North Korean multi-part films series